Rainbow Group may refer to two political groups of the European Parliament:

Rainbow Group (1984–1989)
Rainbow Group (1989–1994)

See also
 Political groups of the European Parliament